Brothers-4 is an album by organist Don Patterson with saxophonist Sonny Stitt recorded in 1969 and released on the Prestige label. The album features guitarist Grant Green, who was credited as Blue Grant for contractual reasons, being then signed to Blue Note Records. The 2001 CD release added 6 bonus tracks recorded at the same session but issued on other albums.

Reception

Allmusic awarded the album 4 stars stating "not the crowning achievement for any of the principals, but they still stand in the front ranks of organ jazz".

Track listing 
All compositions by Don Patterson except where noted.
 "Brothers 4" – 8:52   
 "Creepin' Home" (Billy James) – 6:50   
 "Alexander's Ragtime Band" (Irving Berlin) – 8:26   
 "Walk On By" (Burt Bacharach, Hal David) -8:35   
 "Donny Brook" (Grant Green) – 8:25 Bonus track on CD reissue   
 "Mud Turtle" – 9:58 Bonus track on CD reissue      
 "St. Thomas" (Sonny Rollins) – 5:28 Bonus track on CD reissue   
 "Good Bait" (Count Basie, Tadd Dameron) – 8:31 Bonus track on CD reissue  
 "Starry Night" (John H. Densmore) – 5:50 Bonus track on CD reissue   
 "Tune Up" (Miles Davis) – 5:24 Bonus track on CD reissue

Personnel 
Don Patterson – organ
Sonny Stitt – varitone, tenor saxophone
Grant Green – guitar
Billy James – drums

References 

Don Patterson (organist) albums
Sonny Stitt albums
1969 albums
Prestige Records albums
Albums produced by Bob Porter (record producer)
Albums recorded at Van Gelder Studio